In mathematics, the q-Krawtchouk polynomials  are a family of basic hypergeometric orthogonal polynomials in the basic Askey scheme . give a detailed list of their properties.

 showed that the q-Krawtchouk polynomials are spherical functions for 3 different Chevalley groups over finite fields, and  showed that they are related to representations of the quantum group SU(2).

Definition
The polynomials are given in terms of basic hypergeometric functions by

See also
 affine q-Krawtchouk polynomials
 dual q-Krawtchouk polynomials
 quantum q-Krawtchouk polynomials

Sources

Orthogonal polynomials
Q-analogs
Special hypergeometric functions